Konttinen is a Finnish surname. Notable people with the surname include:

Helena Konttinen (1871–1916), Finnish christian prophet
Sirkka-Liisa Konttinen (born 1948), Finnish photographer

Finnish-language surnames